Rannamõisa is a village in Harku Parish, Harju County in northern Estonia. It has a population of 645 (as of 1 June 2010).

The Rannamõisa cliff coastline was depicted on the 50 kroon that circulated in 1928–1940.

References

Villages in Harju County